Danijel Dejan Djuric (born 5 January 2003) is a professional footballer who plays as a forward for Icelandic club Víkingur Reykjavík. Born in Bulgaria to a Serbian father and a Bulgarian mother, he plays for the Iceland national team.

Club career 
Born in Bulgaria to a Bulgarian mother and Serbian father, Djuric moved to Iceland aged two. His first youth club was Hvöt from Blönduós, before joining Breiðablik when his family moved to Kópavogur in 2012. In 2019, he transferred to the youth side of Danish club FC Midtjylland.

In July 2022, Djuric started his senior career when he transferred to Víkingur Reykjavík from Midtjylland.

International career 
He has featured for the U15, U16, U17, U18, U19 and U21 youth teams of Iceland. He made his debut with the senior team in a friendly match against South Korea on 11 November 2022, playing the first 73 minutes.

Honours
Víkingur Reykjavík
 Icelandic Cup: 2022

References

External links
 
 Danijel Djuric - UEFA
 

2003 births
Sportspeople from Varna, Bulgaria
Living people
Icelandic footballers
Serbian footballers
Iceland international footballers
Serbian emigrants to Bulgaria
Serbian emigrants to Iceland
Serbian people of Bulgarian descent
Icelandic people of Bulgarian descent
Serbian expatriate sportspeople in Iceland
Úrvalsdeild karla (football) players
Association football forwards